Rental refers to the act of renting.

Rental or Rentals may also refer to:

Robert Rental (1952–2000), British musician
The Rental, 2020 American film
The Rentals, American rock band